Klein Wanzleben is a village and a former municipality in the Börde district in Saxony-Anhalt, Germany. Since September 1, 2010, it is now part of the town Wanzleben-Börde.

References

Former municipalities in Saxony-Anhalt
Wanzleben-Börde